Hietalahti Stadium, also known as Elisa Stadion for sponsorship reasons, is a multi-purpose stadium in Vaasa, Finland. It is currently used mostly for football matches and is the home stadium of Vaasan Palloseura. The stadium has a capacity of 6,009 spectators.

The stadium was originally built in 1935. It was expanded to its current capacity in 2015–2016. The name sponsor of the stadium is the Finnish telecommunications company Elisa.

Hietalahti Stadium co-hosted the 2018 UEFA European Under-19 Championship in July 2018.

References

External links
Official site
Stadium information at StadiumDB.com

Football venues in Finland
Vaasa
Multi-purpose stadiums in Finland
Sport in Vaasa
Buildings and structures in Ostrobothnia (region)
Sports venues completed in 1935